Deh Gah-e Jalaleh (also Romanized as Deh Gāh-e Jalāleh; also known as Deh Gāh) is a village in Sadat Mahmudi Rural District, Pataveh District, Dana County, Kohgiluyeh and Boyer-Ahmad Province, Iran. At the 2006 census, its population was 421, in 65 families.

References 

Populated places in Dana County